is a tram station located in Toshima, Tokyo, Japan. It opened on December 12, 1925. On maps, it is marked as an interchange with the Tokyo Metro Yurakucho Line at Higashi-ikebukuro Station.

Lines 
This stop is served by the Tokyo Sakura Tram operated by Tokyo Metropolitan Bureau of Transportation (Toei).

External links
 Toden Higashi-Ikebukuro-yonchōme Station 

Railway stations in Japan opened in 1925
Railway stations in Tokyo